The Honda J-VX was the first hybrid sports car concept to employ Honda's Integrated Motor Assist electric hybrid system and was initially unveiled at the Tokyo Motor Show in October, 1997. It achieved 70mpg (30km/L) and featured a 1.0 liter, 3 cylinder VTEC engine, supercapacitor electrical storage, an all-glass roof, airbag-like "air belts", used lightweight materials, and aerodynamic design. Eventually it would evolve into the Honda VV, a Pre-production prototype of the Honda Insight.

External links 
Development History at InsightCentral.net
J-VX at InsightMan.com
J-VX at CarThrottle.com

J-VX